Dorton Dons was a tug-of-war team in the 1960s and 1970s. Managed and coached by Don Claridge of Dorton in Buckinghamshire, they won regional and national championships. Whilst the team was based and trained in Dorton, it drew many of the team from local villages such as Brill, Ludgershall and Oakley. One training method utilised was looping the rope over a tree's branch and pulling a 45-gallon drum of concrete to the top. During the late 70's a revival of the Dorton Dons was attempted. John Faulkner and Raymond Pentony, Don Driver with Tony Bolton and Bill Tipping would often be seen pulling the 45 gallon drum high into the air. The drum itself still sits in the river below the tree branch.

Sport in Buckinghamshire